Philanthus ventilabris is a species of bee-hunting wasp (or "beewolf") found throughout North America. It is a solitary species.

References

Crabronidae
Hymenoptera of North America
Insects described in 1798